Bert V. Royal Jr. (born October 14, 1977) is an American screenwriter, playwright, and former casting director.  He is best known as the writer of the play Dog Sees God: Confessions of a Teenage Blockhead, which premiered Off-Broadway in 2005, and the 2010 teen film Easy A.

Early life
Royal grew up in Green Cove Springs, Florida. He did not attend high school, and instead was homeschooled. He later attended St. Johns River State College's Florida School of the Arts, where he majored in acting, but quit after two years because he felt he could not act.

Career
Royal moved from Florida to New York City at the age of 21 after receiving an internship at the Public Theater. He first worked in casting, where he was involved in the casting of Third Watch and Chappelle's Show, but quit after five years to become a writer. His first successful script was for Dog Sees God: Confessions of a Teenage Blockhead, a play centering on the Peanuts comic strip characters as teenagers. Royal submitted the script to the 2004 New York International Fringe Festival, where it won the award for Best Overall Production and was picked up by producer Dede Harris to become an Off-Broadway production, premiering in December 2005. Dog Sees God won the 2004 GLAAD Media Award for Best Off-Broadway Play and the 2006 HX Award for Best Off-Broadway Play, among other awards.

Following the 2007–2008 Writers Guild of America strike, Royal wrote the spec script for the high school comedy film Easy A. He sold the script to Screen Gems almost immediately and the film commenced principal photography nine months later. After Easy A was released in September 2010, Royal wrote a television pilot set in Jacksonville, Florida, which was picked up and shot by MTV. , he is writing a television series for CBS Television Studios and an adaptation of the 2002 Japanese horror film 2LDK.

Personal life
Royal is openly gay and has said that Brandon, a gay character in Easy A, was based on himself. He lives in the Los Angeles Toluca Lake neighborhood.

References

External links

1977 births
21st-century American dramatists and playwrights
American male screenwriters
American television writers
American gay writers
American LGBT screenwriters
Living people
People from Aurora, Colorado
People from Green Cove Springs, Florida
Writers from Los Angeles
American LGBT dramatists and playwrights
LGBT people from Colorado
American male television writers
American male dramatists and playwrights
American casting directors
21st-century American male writers
Screenwriters from California
Screenwriters from Florida
Screenwriters from Colorado
21st-century American screenwriters
21st-century LGBT people